Teldenia subpura is a moth in the family Drepanidae. It was described by Rothschild in 1915. It is found in West Papua and on Obi Island and Sulawesi.

The length of the forewings is 14.5–16 mm for males and 15–17 mm for females.

References

Moths described in 1915
Drepaninae
Moths of Indonesia